The Yamaneko Group of Comet Observers (YGCO) is a famous group of astronomical observers based in Japan. Founded by K. Ichikawa in 1980, the members have obtained approximately 12,300 astronomic and 6,300 photometric observations. This group maintains the YGCO Chiyoda Station, also based in Japan.

Members 
 Akimasa Nakamura

See also 
 List of astronomical societies

References 

Astronomy organizations